Anthericum ramosum, known as branched St Bernard's-lily, is a herbaceous perennial plant with a rhizome. The genus Anthericum is currently placed in the family Asparagaceae, subfamily Agavoideae. It was formerly placed in its own family, Anthericaceae, and before that in the Liliaceae.

Description
It has an erect, paniculate inflorescence. The flower spikes are branched (hence the Latin name ramosus), unlike Anthericum liliago. The flower is scentless and pure white, the anthers are bright yellow. The flowering period extends from June through August. The capsular fruit is spherical to three-faced. The flowers are pollinated by hymenopterans, while seed are distributed by the wind.

Distribution
This species is present in most of Europe, being more common in southern countries, and is widespread in Central Asia and Russia.

Habitat
These plants grow in sunny areas and calcareous soils, on semiarid grasslands, slopes and forest edges.

References

 Pignatti S. - Flora d'Italia - Edagricole – 1982 Vol. III

External links
 Biolib
 Plants
 Rare Plants

Agavoideae
Flora of Europe
Plants described in 1753
Taxa named by Carl Linnaeus